Clas Eriksson (born February 20, 1973) is a Swedish former professional ice hockey player.

Eriksson is currently a team manager and coach for his former club Färjestads BK. During his career, Eriksson played for Färjestads BK, apart from one and half seasons with Grums IK from 1991 to 1992. During his 13 seasons with Färjestads, he won three Swedish Championships in 1997, 1998, and 2002. In 2004 he was forced to retire due to an injury.

Personal life
Eriksson's son, Joel Eriksson Ek, currently plays within the Minnesota Wild organization of the National Hockey League and his younger son Olle was drafted by the Anaheim Ducks in the 2017 NHL Entry Draft.

References

External links

1973 births
Färjestad BK players
Living people
Swedish ice hockey forwards
Sportspeople from Karlstad